Robert John Sayer (born 25 January 1995) is an English cricketer who played for Leicestershire County Cricket Club. He is a right-arm off spin bowler who also bats right-handed. He made his list A debut for Leicestershire against the touring New Zealanders in June 2015. He is the older brother of another Leicestershire cricketer, David Sayer.

References

External links
 

1995 births
Living people
English cricketers
Leicestershire cricketers
Cambridgeshire cricketers
People from Huntingdon